The Mining Encyclopedia is a Ukrainian language comprehensive set of encyclopedias about the science and technology of mining. The encyclopedias were compiled by more than 100 of the leading earth scientists in Ukraine and overseas, headed by Volodymyr Biletskyy.

The first installment of the project, the Explanatory Dictionary of Mining was published in 1998 by the Donetsk National Technical University and is now available online.

The second phase of the project involved the publication of the 3-volume Encyclopedic Dictionary of Mining between 2001 and 2004. This set contains 12,700 encyclopedic articles.

The third stage involved the publication of the 3-volume Concise Mining Encyclopedia between 2004 and 2013. This comprehensive set contains 17,350 entries, with numerous illustrations. A valuable feature of the encyclopedia is that all entries are written simultaneously in Ukrainian, Russian, English and German languages.

These encyclopedias are used as textbooks at the National Mining University of Ukraine.

See also

 Geology of Ukraine
 List of mines in Ukraine
 Science and technology in Ukraine

Notes

References

External links 

 Explanatory Dictionary of Mining online
 Mining Encyclopaedic Dictionary: Volume 1 A-K online
 Concise Mining Encyclopaedia: Volume 1 A–K online
 Concise Mining Encyclopaedia: Volume 2 Л-Р online
 Concise Mining Encyclopaedia: Volume 3 С-Я online

1998 non-fiction books
Ukrainian encyclopedias
Works about mining
Mining in Ukraine
20th-century encyclopedias
21st-century encyclopedias
Ukrainian-language encyclopedias
Ukrainian-language books
Specialized encyclopedias